This is a list of the NCAA outdoor champions in the 4x110 yard relay until 1975, and the metric 4x100 meters relay being contested after metrication occurred in 1976.  Hand timing was used until 1973, starting in 1974 fully automatic timing was used.

Champions
Key
y=yards
A=Altitude assisted

References

GBR Athletics

External links
NCAA Division I men's outdoor track and field

NCAA Men's Division I Outdoor Track and Field Championships
Outdoor track, men
4x4 relay